Wytham Ditches and Flushes is a  biological Site of Special Scientific Interest north of Oxford in Oxfordshire.

These ditches have a rich aquatic and fen flora. Uncommon wetland plants include greater water-parsnip, greater spearwort, water violet, brookweed, narrow-leaved water plantain and creeping jenny. There is also a small tussocky field which is kept partly waterlogged by flushes.

References

 
Sites of Special Scientific Interest in Oxfordshire